Renat Nelli, who was born in Carcassonne, Aude in 1906 and died in 1982, was one of the major Occitan writers of the 20th century. 

In Vichy France, Nelli joined the French Resistance and in 1945 was one of the co-founders of the Institut d'Estudis Occitans. He also co-wrote the special issue of the Cahiers du Sud magazine on "the Genius of Òc and the Mediterranean Man" (1943), in which the three main lines of his literary mission stand out: the publication and translation of medieval Occitan poets; publishing his own poems; and being a critic. His collections are marked with sensuality and draw their inspiration from the mystical traditions of Cathars and trobadors. He later tried his hand at prose and drama. Renat Nelli is known in French as René Nelli.

Works
 Entre l’espèr e l’abséncia (Between Hope and Absence), 1942
 Arma de vertat (A Soul for Real), 1952
 Vespèr e la luna dels fraisses (Vespèr and the Moon of the Ash Trees), 1962
 L'érotique des troubadours, Toulouse, Privat, 1963 (& 10/18 - 2 vol. - 1974)
 Beatrís de Planissòlas, 1972, a play
 Per una nuèit d'estieu (On a Summer Night), 1976

1906 births
1982 deaths
People from Carcassonne
Occitan-language writers
French Resistance members
20th-century French historians
Historians of Catharism